UdiWWW is an early, now discontinued freeware graphical HTML 3.2 web browser for 16-bit and 32-bit Microsoft Windows. It was written and developed by Bernd Richter in C/C++ from 1995 to 1996. Following the release of version 1.2 in April 1996, Richter ceased development, stating "let Microsoft with the ActiveX Development Kit do the rest."

UdiWWW was among the first web browsers to support the then proposed HTML 3.0 standard. In doing so, it was also among the first browsers to support the specifications html math, html figures, and the PNG image format, which other leading browsers at the time such as Netscape and Internet Explorer 2.0 did not. The browser gained some popularity during 1996, but after development was abandoned, the browser fell out of favor.

The browser is no longer available from its original homepage.  However, it (and its source) can still be downloaded from mirror sites.

History
UdiWWW was created for the UDINE Projekt (Universal Document Information and Navigation Environment). UDINE was started in 1992 and the goal was to "create a flexible, multimedia information system that is able to show different files (text, picture, audio, and video) with a similar user interface on different systems."
To be able to read "web information" the UDINE project was expanded by a web browser. It was not able to integrate common browsers like the NSCA Mosaic because of the client-server architecture without modification. The source code of Mosaic was not available at that time, so the university started their own project. UDINE-WWW-Viewer was created and had most features of HTML 3 integrated.

Features
UdiWWW has the following features as of Version 1.2:
 
It also features a clock in the lower right hand corner that tells how long the browser has been up.

There is no official help file; rather, in the included .hlp file, Bernd Richter stated, "This help file was automatically created by the developing environment and is quite useless. As you know, UdiWWW is a 'One Man Show' and the author could not find time for writing help files."

Criticism
UdiWWW was criticized for lacking many advanced features like news, FTP, HTML4, Dynamic HTML, support for targeted windows, a "new window" command for launching multiple sessions, client side image mapping, and security.  It was also seen to be slow.

Releases
The following versions were released:

32-Bit

16-bit

Notes
The browser was only available via download.

All releases were compressed using the PKSFX Self-Extract Utility Version 2.04g shareware version.

The browser's source, which has been released into the public domain, is available at Archive.org.

Technical

The user agent for UdiWWW is UdiWWW/<version> so the latest one is UdiWWW/1.2.000.

A typical get request from the UdiWWW browser would be as follows:

GET http://www.wikipedia.org/ HTTP/1.0
Date:Sat, Mar 13, 2010 18:42:02 "GMT"
MessageID: <10031318024194304>
MIME-Version: 1.0
User-Agent: UdiWWW/1.2.000
Accept: image/gif, image/x-xbitmap, image/jpeg, image/pjpeg, image/png
Accept: text/html;version=3.0, text/plain, */*

Although the browser's HTML3 support allows it to view most webpages, its lack of support for HTTP virtual hosting requires the use of a proxy server for many current websites.

System requirements
UdiWWW has the following system requirements:
 Processor: 80386 or better
 Operating system: Windows 3.1 / 3.11 / NT / 95
 Ram: 8 MB RAM
 A TCP/IP connection running Winsock

Further reading

References

External links
 
 UdiWWW Download, Internet.com
 
 UdiWWW, Evolt.org
 Experiences with UdiWWW
 UdiWWW, The Winsock-L FTP Area
 Screenshots of UdiWWW, ImageShack

1995 software
1996 software
Windows web browsers
Discontinued web browsers
Gopher (protocol)